In Greek mythology, Aerope (Ancient Greek: Ἀερόπη) was a daughter of Cepheus of Arcadia, who was king of Tegea. She had a son (Aeropus?) by Ares, but herself died in labor. The child survived by sucking its dead mother's breasts, which Ares had caused to still produce an abundance of milk. Because of this, Ares was called Aphneius ("Abundant"), and was honored under that name with a sanctuary on Mount Cresius. Pausanias goes on to report that the hill was said to have been given the name Aeropus.

Notes

References
 Bell, Robert E., Women of Classical Mythology: A Biographical Dictionary. ABC-Clio. 1991. .
Grimal, Pierre, The Dictionary of Classical Mythology, Wiley-Blackwell, 1996. .
 Parada, Carlos, Genealogical Guide to Greek Mythology, Jonsered, Paul Åströms Förlag, 1993. .
 Pausanias, Pausanias Description of Greece with an English Translation by W.H.S. Jones, Litt.D., and H.A. Ormerod, M.A., in 4 Volumes. Cambridge, Massachusetts, Harvard University Press; London, William Heinemann Ltd. 1918. Online version at the Perseus Digital Library.
 Smith, William, Dictionary of Greek and Roman Biography and Mythology, London (1873). Online version at the Perseus Digital Library.
 Tripp, Edward, Crowell's Handbook of Classical Mythology, Thomas Y. Crowell Co; First edition (June 1970). .

Princesses in Greek mythology
Women of Ares
Arcadian mythology